Ann Elizabeth Dunwoody (born January 14, 1953) is a retired general of the United States Army. She was the first woman in United States military and uniformed service history to achieve a four-star officer rank, receiving her fourth star on November 14, 2008.

In 2005 Dunwoody became the United States Army's top-ranking female when she received the promotion to lieutenant general (three stars) and became the army's Deputy Chief of Staff, G-4 (logistics). She was nominated as Commanding General, United States Army Materiel Command, by President George W. Bush on June 23, 2008, and confirmed by the Senate one month later. She served in that capacity until August 7, 2012, and retired from the army on August 15, 2012.

Early life and education 
Dunwoody was born in 1953 at Fort Belvoir, Virginia to Elizabeth and Harold Dunwoody. Her father was a career army officer, and the family lived in Germany and Belgium while she was growing up. She graduated from Supreme Headquarters Allied Powers Europe (SHAPE) American High School in 1971.

At age 5, Dunwoody decided she wanted nothing more than to become a doctor or nurse. Although she came from a family with a strong tradition of military service, she had very little interest in serving in the military. After high school Dunwoody attended State University of New York College at Cortland. During her junior year of college, Dunwoody attended a four-week Army introductory program that could be continued, if interested, with an eleven-week Women's Officer Orientation Course, which then led to a two-year commitment. In 1975 she committed and became a 2nd lieutenant in the Quartermaster Corps where she learned to jump from airplanes. It was then that she realized the army was "an organization that was as values-based as the family I came out of, and to find probably my real passion was soldiering. I just didn't know it because I had never experienced it."

Career 

In 1975, Dunwoody graduated from State University of New York College at Cortland with a degree in physical education—Cortland is a Top Ten school in that field—and was direct commissioned into the Women's Army Corps. In an interview with the Military Logistics Forum, Dunwoody explained what drew her to become a soldier:

Dunwoody's first assignment was as a platoon leader with the 226th Maintenance Company, 100th Supply and Services Battalion, Fort Sill, Oklahoma. During her 30 years as a Quartermaster Corps officer she commanded the 226th Maintenance Company Fort Sill, Oklahoma; 5th Quartermaster Detachment (Airborne) Kaiserslautern, Germany; the 407th Supply and Service Battalion/ 782d Main Support Battalion (MSB), Fort Bragg, North Carolina; the 10th Mountain Division Support Command (DISCOM), Fort Drum, New York; the 1st Corps Support Command (1st COSCOM), Fort Bragg, North Carolina; the Military Traffic Management Command (MTMC)/Military Surface Deployment and Distribution Command (SDDC), Alexandria, Virginia; and the Combined Arms Support Command (CASCOM), Fort Lee, Virginia.

Dunwoody's major staff assignments include service as the Parachute Officer, 82nd Airborne Division; strategic planner for the Chief of Staff of the Army (CSA); Executive Officer to the Director, Defense Logistics Agency; and Deputy Chief of Staff for Logistics G-4.

From May 1989 to May 1991, Dunwoody served as executive officer and later division parachute officer for the 407th Supply and Transportation Battalion, 82nd Airborne Division, at Fort Bragg and deployed to Saudi Arabia for Operation Desert Shield/Operation Desert Storm. in 2001, As the 1st Corps Support Command Commander she deployed the Logistics Task Force in support of Operation Enduring Freedom 1 and stood up the Joint Logistics Command in Uzbekistan in support of Combined Joint Task Force (CJTF)-180. As Commander of Surface Deployment and Distribution Command (SDDC), she supported the largest deployment and redeployment of United States forces since World War II.

Sexual assault prevention 
Dunwoody, along with George W. Casey Jr. were avid in pushing for a decrease in sexual assault within the United States Army. Dunwoody believes that the United States Army should set an example for the rest of the world and that they have "critical work left to do" in order to significantly decrease sexual assault, but they are making progress.

Logistics 
Dunwoody was in charge of all army logistics. Her education came from the Florida Institute of Technology and the Industrial College of the Armed Forces. During her career, Dunwoody managed the largest global logistics command in Army history (69,000 military and civilians, located in all 50 states and more than 140 countries). Along with that she managed a budget of $60 billion and was responsible for oversight of approximately $70 billion in service contracts and "managed and operationalized the Army's global supply chain for numerous engagements." Army Chief of Staff Gen. Ray Odierno claimed that Dunwoody was "quite simply the best logistician the Army has ever had."

Dunwoody participated with First Lady Michelle Obama in a forum for promising girls in Washington, D.C. public schools in March 2009.

Dunwoody officially retired from the United States Army after 37 years on August 15, 2012.

Career firsts 

Among her notable firsts, she became the first woman to command a battalion in the 82nd Airborne Division in 1992. She became Fort Bragg's first female general officer in 2000. She became the first woman to command the Combined Arms Support Command at Fort Lee, Virginia, in 2004. And in 2005, Dunwoody became the first female soldier to achieve three-star rank since Lieutenant General Claudia J. Kennedy, the former Deputy Chief of Staff for Intelligence, who retired in 2000.

On November 14, 2008, Dunwoody became the first woman in United States military history to achieve the rank of four-star general. Her promotion ceremony was held at the Pentagon, with introductory speeches by United States Secretary of Defense Robert Gates and Army Chief of Staff General George W. Casey.

Casey's successor as Army chief of staff, General Raymond T. Odierno, intended to recommend Dunwoody to succeed Air Force general Duncan J. McNabb as commander of the United States Transportation Command in 2011, which would have made her the first Army general to lead TRANSCOM as well as the first female combatant commander. Dunwoody, citing the physical toll of her present duties, declined the offer, opting to retire after finishing her tour at AMC. The aforementioned milestones were instead filled by Army general Stephen R. Lyons and Air Force general Lori J. Robinson respectively.

Education 
 Graduated from the State University of New York College at Cortland in 1975, receiving a bachelor's degree in Physical Education.
 Quartermaster Officers’ Basic Course and Basic Airborne School in 1976
 Quartermaster Officers Advanced Course
 Command and General Staff College
 Master of Science Degree in Logistics Management from the Florida Institute of Technology in 1988.
 Master of Science degree in National Resource Strategy from the Industrial College of the Armed Forces in 1995.
 United States Army Jumpmaster Course graduate.

Personal life 

Dunwoody was born to Harold and Elizabeth Dunwoody. She has two siblings: Harold H. "Buck" Dunwoody (First Lieutenant-Army), and Susan Schoeck (Army pilot). In 1989 she married Colonel Craig Brotchie, USAF. They have no children, but own a dog named Barney.
Dunwoody currently lives with her husband in Tampa, Florida where her brother and sister live, and where her husband currently serves on the board of the Special Operations Warrior Foundation.

Dunwoody has a long family history of United States military service—going back five generations. She grew up in a military household. Her great-grandfather, Brigadier General Henry Harrison Chase Dunwoody, a 1866 graduate of the United States Military Academy, was the Chief Signal Officer in Cuba from 1898 to 1901. Her father retired from the United States Army as a brigadier general in 1973. Brigadier General Dunwoody is a highly decorated veteran of World War II, the Korean War and the Vietnam War. He was badly wounded in France during World War II and earned the Distinguished Service Cross for bravery while serving as a battalion commander in the Korean War. As a brigadier general, he commanded the 1st Brigade, 5th Infantry Division (Mechanized) during the Vietnam War. Her brother, Harold H. "Buck" Dunwoody Jr. is a 1970 West Point graduate. Her older sister, Susan Schoeck, was the third woman in the army to become a helicopter pilot. Her niece, Jennifer Schoeck, is a United States Air Force fighter pilot.

Dunwoody is the daughter of Harold Dunwoody, her inspiration "My own personal hero is my dad, he is a proud World War II, Korea, Vietnam veteran," she said. "And he was a real soldier's soldier. And much of who I am is founded on what I learned from my dad, as a soldier, as a patriot, and as a father."

Military awards, decorations, and honors 
Dunwoody's military awards and decorations include:

Other honors 
 1998 Recipient of the Military Distinguished Order of Saint Martin (Army Quartermaster Corps).
 2001 Distinguished Alumna for Cortland State SUNY.
 2002 Inducted as a Distinguished Member of the Quartermaster Regiment.
 2004 Recipient of the National Defense Transportation Association's DoD Distinguished Service Award.
 2007 Recipient of Military Order of the World Wars (MOWW) Distinguished Service Award.
 2008 First female four-star general in the United States Armed Services.
 2012 Inducted into the Quartermaster Hall of Fame
 2012 Recipient Ancient Order of Saint Martin (Army Quartermaster Corps)
 2009 recipient of the Association of the Industrial College of the Armed Forces Eisenhower Award
 2011 recipient of the National Collegiate Athletic Association's Theodore Roosevelt Award
 2011 recipient of the French National Order of Merit
 2013 Inducted into the U.S. Army Women's Foundation Hall of Fame
 Keys to: Madison County, Huntsville city and Madison city
 USO Woman of the Year
 2018 Honorary Doctorate of Humanities. Michigan State University
 2019 recipient of the Sylvanus Thayer Award

See also 
 List of female United States military generals and flag officers

References

Further reading

External links 

 
 
 
 
 AnnDunwoody.com. Official website.
 Complete text, audio, video of Ann Dunwoody's Speech at the 4-Star Promotion Ceremony at AmericanRhetoric.com

1953 births
Living people
Female generals of the United States Army
Florida Institute of Technology alumni
Military personnel from Virginia
People from Cattaraugus County, New York
Recipients of the Legion of Merit
Quartermasters
Recipients of the Defense Superior Service Medal
Recipients of the Distinguished Service Medal (US Army)
State University of New York at Cortland alumni
United States Army Command and General Staff College alumni
People from Fort Belvoir, Virginia
Recipients of the Meritorious Service Medal (United States)
21st-century American women